The Russian Bloc (Russian: Русский блок) is a former political alliance in Ukraine.

It consisted of:
Rus'-Ukrainian Union
Union Party
For Russian Unity

At the 2002 Ukrainian parliamentary election, it won 0.73% of the popular vote and no seats.

References

Defunct political party alliances in Ukraine
Russian nationalist organizations
Russian political parties in Ukraine